Blank Check (in the United Kingdom originally released as Blank Cheque) is a 1994 American comedy film directed by Rupert Wainwright and starring Brian Bonsall, Karen Duffy, Miguel Ferrer, James Rebhorn, Tone Lōc, Jayne Atkinson and Michael Lerner. It was released on February 11, 1994, by Walt Disney Pictures. The film follows a boy who inherits a blank check and uses it to buy a house under an alter ego, but is soon being searched for by several members of the bank he cashed it under. Upon release, the film received negative reviews, but was a box office success grossing $39 million on a $13 million budget.

Plot 
11-year-old Preston Waters laments his relative lack of money compared to his entrepreneurial older brothers and his working class father, an investor. His situation regularly leads him to humiliating situations including having his brothers, 16-year-old Damian and 15-year-old Ralph, commandeer his bedroom as an office for their home business. He is also forced to attend his bully Butch's birthday party at Cliffside Fun Park, where he is unable to afford anything other than the kiddie rides because his father is very frugal with money.

One day, he gets involved in a bike accident with escaped convict Carl Quigley, who had just left a Zero Halliburton briefcase containing $1,000,000 in stolen cash in the care of bank president Edward H. Biderman to be laundered and retrieved by an associate the next day. Afraid of drawing attention from the police, Quigley hastily hands Preston a signed blank check and flees the scene.

Preston is grounded by his father for not taking care of his possessions. He then uses his computer to fill out the check himself for $1,000,000 and attempts to cash it the next day. He is taken to Biderman, who believes Preston is the associate named “Juice” that Quigley told him he was sending. Believing this is part of Quigley's plan, Biderman fills Preston’s backpack with $1,000,000 in clean money and Preston leaves the bank just as the real Juice arrives for the money. An angered Quigley sets out to find Preston with Juice hoping to reclaim his stolen money and threatens Biderman with death unless he comes along. Meanwhile, Preston goes on a spending spree, purchasing a large house and a limousine service with a chauffeur named Henry, and then fills the house with toys, gadgets, and electronics all in the name of a mysterious employer he creates named "Macintosh", after his brothers' computer. Preston uses a computer program called MacSpeak as the voice of Mr. Macintosh in order to buy a house over the phone.

Shay Stanley, a teller from the bank, seeks out Preston and his employer Mr. Macintosh, after the realtor who sold the house to Macintosh deposits $300,000 cash with her bank. Shay, an undercover FBI agent investigating Biderman for money laundering, is suspicious of the sudden flow of cash that has come through Biderman’s bank and follows the trail to Preston/Macintosh. Denied a meeting with Macintosh, Preston claims that he handles some of Macintosh’s financial affairs and the two end up going on a business date. Later, Preston throws an expensive birthday party for himself and Macintosh for which the party planner Yvonne takes at least $40,000 in cash from Preston, claiming it covers the fees for the event. Yvonne later gives Preston the party planning bill and cost which is $100,000. Preston invites Shay and Henry to the party, with many others showing up. At the party, Preston learns that he only has $332 left and that he cannot pay the planner what he owes for the party.

Still checking on the computer, his dad shows up talking to the so-called Macintosh. He tells him that if he sees where Preston is at and tells him to send him home because it is his birthday. He just takes a second to talk about his son. He talks about how he puts pressure on his son, how he doesn’t listen to him and about having money. He leaves and Preston starts crying and realizes that his dad is not there. The planner shuts the party down, leaving Preston alone in the empty house. Quigley, Biderman, and Juice arrive and demand Preston return the money, only to find out Preston has spent all of it in six days; Biderman tells Quigley about helming the Macintosh name in hopes of inheriting the new life he was hoping for. After pursuing Preston throughout the property when the latter tries to escape, the FBI shows up with Shay in time to save Preston.

Quigley announces that he is Macintosh, thinking that assuming the false identity would grant him the new life he was seeking after escaping prison. However, the FBI arrest Quigley for numerous crimes they intended to charge to Macintosh, along with Biderman and Juice as accomplices. Preston says goodbye to Shay and Henry before returning to his family to celebrate his birthday, now understanding that money cannot buy happiness and that family is what matters most.

Cast 
 Brian Bonsall as Preston Waters, aka Mr. Macintosh
 Karen Duffy as Shay Stanley
 Miguel Ferrer as Carl Quigley
 Michael Lerner as Edward Biderman
 Tone Lōc as Juice
 James Rebhorn as Fred Waters
 Jayne Atkinson as Sandra Waters
 Rick Ducommun as Henry
 Debbie Allen as Yvonne
 Chris Demetral as Damian Waters
 Michael Faustino as Ralph Waters
 Alex Zuckerman as Butch

Production 
Blank Check was filmed in Austin, San Antonio, and Dallas. The castle house that Preston buys was filmed at the Pemberton Castle (Fisher Gideon House) at 1415 Wooldridge Drive in Austin, a Texas Historical Landmark, which is now owned by filmmaker Robert Rodriguez. The theme park in the beginning of the movie was Six Flags Fiesta Texas; several of the park's attractions, including The Rattler and Power Surge, were filmed in this movie.

The bank featured in the movie is in the historic Alamo National Bank Building. The bank lobby was featured and it has a 23 story office tower above it. The building opened in 1929, and today houses the Drury Plaza Hotel.

Reception

Critical reception 
On review aggregator Rotten Tomatoes, the film holds an approval rating of 9% based on 11 reviews, with an average rating of 2.98/10. On Metacritic, the film has a weighted average score of 42 out of 100, based on nine critics, indicating "mixed or average reviews". Audiences polled by CinemaScore gave the film an average grade of "A−" on an A+ to F scale.

Peter Rainer of the Los Angeles Times stating that what was "missing from this film is any trace of the joy in simple pleasures. Preston isn't a very imaginative child; he's a goodies gatherer." Janet Maslin of The New York Times said that it "looks like the best bet for family audiences in a season short on kiddie oriented entertainment. And it's a movie that no parents in their right minds should let children see."

The Chicago Tribune stated that "[w]ith its contrived plot, its MTV-inspired montages and its blatant shilling for products, it is film as hard sell, and it comes with a decidedly suspect warranty. Its mercantile instincts are so primary it looks like an infomercial."

Kissing controversy 
In recent years, the appropriateness of a scene depicting a kiss between Preston and Shay near the end of the film has been called into question, particularly with Shay's job as an agent with the FBI. Brian Bonsall was 12 years old at the time of filming, while Karen Duffy was 31. Concerns were first raised in a September 2009 episode of the review web series Nostalgia Critic.

In January 2017, Blank Check was made available on Netflix in the United States, which led many critics to review the film anew. Observers Dana Schwartz claimed the kissing scene left her feeling "totally grossed out", while Kylie Queen from WJBQ described the act as "borderline pedophilia". In March 2020, the Disney+ streaming service came under criticism for not featuring the Love, Simon spinoff television series Love, Victor, deeming it to be "too adult", but making Blank Check available to view with the kissing scene still featuring.

Box office 
Blank Check debuted at number 3 at the US box office behind Ace Ventura: Pet Detective and The Getaway with $5.4 million in its opening weekend. In total, the film went on to gross $30.5 million in the United States and Canada and $38.8 million worldwide.

Year-end lists 
 1st worst – Melinda Miller, The Buffalo News

References

External links 
 
 
 
 

1990s children's comedy films
1994 films
American children's comedy films
Films about children
Films about identity theft
Films directed by Rupert Wainwright
Films set in Indiana
Films shot in San Antonio
Walt Disney Pictures films
1994 directorial debut films
1994 comedy films
Films with screenplays by Blake Snyder
Films scored by Nicholas Pike
Films shot in Dallas
1990s English-language films
1990s American films
Obscenity controversies in film